Conviction is a finding that a defendant is guilty of committing a crime.

Conviction may also refer to:

Law
 Conviction and execution of Steven Michael Woods Jr.
 Conviction and exoneration of Glenn Ford
 Conviction of Michael Shields
 Conviction politics
 Conviction rate

Religion
 Conviction (religion), a Christian belief that the Holy Spirit informs an individual of their sin

Arts, entertainment, and media

Films
Conviction (2002 film), a 2002 film about the life of Carl Upchurch
Conviction (2010 film), a 2010 film about the life of Betty Anne Waters
The Conviction, a 1991 Italian film

Games
Tom Clancy's Splinter Cell: Conviction, the fifth game in the Splinter Cell series

Literature
Conviction (Patterson novel), a 2004 novel by American author Richard North Patterson
Conviction (play), a play by Eve Ensler
Conviction (Star Wars novel), a 2011 Star Wars novel by Aaron Allston
Conviction, a novel by Ann Hatton

Music
Convictions (band), an American Christian metalcore band from Ohio
Conviction (Aiden album), 2007
Conviction (Signal Aout 42 album)
Conviction (The Crimson Armada album), 2011
Conviction (UT album), 1986

Television

Shows
Conviction (2004 TV series), a 2004 BBC crime television drama in 6 parts
Conviction (2006 TV series), a 2006 American television drama series that aired on NBC
Conviction (2016 TV series), a 2016 American television legal drama series that aired on ABC

Episodes
"Conviction" (Angel), a 2003 episode of the TV series Angel
"Convictions" (Babylon 5), a 1995 episode of the science fiction TV series Babylon 5

See also
Convict
Convicted (disambiguation)